Once in a Lifetime may refer to:

Film and television
 Once in a Lifetime (1932 film), based on the play by Kaufman and Hart, starring Jack Oakie
 Once in a Lifetime, a 1984 TV special by Talking Heads, also known as "Talking Heads vs. Television"
 Once in a Lifetime (1994 film), a TV film based on a novel by Danielle Steele (see below)
 Once in a Lifetime, a 1995 Hong Kong film starring Sean Lau
 Once in a Lifetime (2000 film) (Livet är en schlager), a Swedish film
 Once in a Lifetime (2014 film), a French film
 Once in a Lifetime: The Extraordinary Story of the New York Cosmos, a 2006 documentary
 "Once in a Lifetime" (Eureka episode), 2006

Music

Songs
 "Once in a Lifetime" (Talking Heads song), from their 1980 album Remain in Light
 "Once in a Lifetime" (Gregorian song), from their 1991 album Sadisfaction
 "To nie ja!", a 1994 song by Edyta Górniak, released in English as "Once in a Lifetime"
 "Once in a Lifetime", the Estonian entry in the Eurovision Song Contest 2000
 "Once in a Lifetime" (Keith Urban song), 2006
 "Once in a Lifetime", a song by 12 Stones from Anthem for the Underdog
 "Once in a Lifetime", a song by All Time Low
 "Once in a Lifetime", a song by Bananarama from their 1987 album Wow!
 "Once in a Lifetime", a song by Beyoncé Knowles from Cadillac Records: Music from the Motion Picture
 "Once in a Lifetime", a song by Chicago from Chicago 17
 "Once in a Lifetime", a song by Craig David from Born to Do It
 "Once in a Lifetime", a song by Dragonforce from Sonic Firestorm
 "Once in a Lifetime", from Flo Rida's 2015 EP My House
 "Once in a Lifetime", a song by Full Intention
 "Once in a Lifetime", a song by Kansas from In the Spirit of Things
 "Once in a Lifetime", a song by Michael Bolton from the 1994 film Only You
 "Once in a Lifetime", a song by Monica from Still Standing
 "Once in a Lifetime", a song by Oleta Adams from Moving On
 "Once in a Lifetime:, a song by One Direction from Four
 "Once in a Lifetime", a song by Wolfsheim from Spectators
 "Once in a Lifetime", a song from the stage musical Stop the World – I Want to Get Off

Albums
 Once in a Lifetime (Talking Heads album), a box set by Talking Heads
 Once in a Lifetime: The Best of Talking Heads, an album
 Once in a Lifetime (David Meece album)
 Once in a Lifetime (Runrig album), 1988
 Once in a Lifetime (Blutengel album), 2013
 Once in a Lifetime Original Soundtrack, a soundtrack album from the 2006 documentary
 Once in a Lifetime, a 2010 compilation album by indie rock band Sodagreen

Other uses
 Once in a Lifetime (play), a 1930 comedy by George S. Kaufman and Moss Hart
 Once in a Lifetime, a 1982 novel by Danielle Steel
 Once in a Lifetime, a performance DVD by Howard Morrison
 Once in a Lifetime, the tagline for the wrestling match between The Rock and John Cena at WrestleMania XXVIII

See also
 Once in a LIVEtime, a 1998 live album by Dream Theatre
 Twice in a Lifetime (disambiguation)